Amanuel Asrat is an Eritrean poet and editor-in-chief of Addis Zemen.

Awards 

PEN Pinter Prize International Writer of Courage Award
Oxfam Novib/PEN Award

References 

Eritrean poets
Living people
Year of birth missing (living people)